Lanny Smoot (born c. 1955)
is an American electrical engineer, inventor, scientist, and theatrical technology creator. With over 100 patents, he is Disney's most prolific inventor  and one of the most prolific Black inventors in American history.
Throughout his career he has worked to inspire young people, especially Black youth, towards STEM.

Biography 
Born in Brooklyn, NY, USA, he later attended Brooklyn Technical High School. He attended Columbia University supported by a Bell Labs Engineering Scholarship and received his Bachelor's degree in Electrical Engineering. He then started work at Bell Communications Research (Bellcore). While working at Bell (later Telcordia, he also completed his Master's Degree in Electrical Engineering from Columbia. Smoot worked at Bell for two decades, where his mentors included James West, co-inventor of the electret microphone. Around 2000, he moved to Disney where he is currently a Disney Research Fellow.

Notable work 

At Bell, Smoot was known for his work on early development of video-on-demand and other video and fibre-optic technology.  He anticipated a future where anyone could broadcast video.

At Disney, Smoot's accomplishments include the drive system for the Star Wars BB-8 droid,
interactive zeotropes for facial animation of objects,
eye imaging for superhero masks and helmets,
“Where’s the Fire?” at Innoventions (Epcot),
many Haunted Mansion special effects,
virtual interactive koi ponds in Hong Kong Disneyland,
Fortress Explorations at Tokyo DisneySea,
"Power City" in Spaceship Earth (Epcot), and
light-sabers for the Star Wars: Galactic Starcruiser experience.
Other patented inventions include new ride technology and glassless 3D displays.

Recognition

References

Further reading
 Disney's Inventor Lanny Smoot 1h 2m video
 Incomplete List of Smoot's US patents

1955 births
20th-century American engineers
20th-century American scientists
20th-century American inventors
20th-century African-American scientists
21st-century American engineers
21st-century American scientists
21st-century American inventors
21st-century African-American scientists
African-American engineers
African-American inventors
American scientists
Brooklyn Technical High School alumni
Columbia University alumni
Disney Research people
Living people
Scientists at Bell Labs
Scientists from Brooklyn